Appanapalli or Appanapalle is a village in Mamidikuduru Mandal, located in Dr. B.R. Ambedkar Konaseema district of Andhra Pradesh, India.

References

Villages in Mamidikuduru mandal